Saphire Longmore-Dropinski (born 1976) politician from the Jamaica Labour Party who currently serves in the Senate of Jamaica. She also worked as a psychiatrist and model. She represented her country at Miss Universe 2000, after winning Miss Jamaica Universe.

Education 
Longmore holds a diploma in Psychiatry.

Personal life 
In 2008, she married European Union diplomat Alex Dropinski.

References

See also 

 14th Parliament of Jamaica

1976 births
Living people
Jamaica Labour Party politicians
21st-century Jamaican politicians
21st-century Jamaican women politicians
Members of the Senate of Jamaica
People from Clarendon Parish, Jamaica

Miss Universe 2000 contestants
Jamaican beauty pageant winners
Jamaican physicians